Bijaya Nagar is a town and market center located in Pyuthan Municipality in Pyuthan, a Middle Hills district of Lumbini Province, western Nepal. The formerly Village Development Committee along with Pyuthan Khalanga, Bijubar, Dakha Kwadi, Bijaya Nagar, Dharmawati, Maranthana and Khaira was merged to form the new municipality since 18 May 2014.

Etymology

Bijaya or Vijaya - victory.
Nagar - settlement or city.
Thus Victory City.

Villages in VDC

References

External links
UN map of VDC boundaries, water features and roads in Pyuthan District

Populated places in Pyuthan District